Tucker Tooley (born 1968/69) is an American film producer. He is the CEO of Tooley Productions LLC, where he independently produced television shows and feature films, including We’re the Millers (2013) which grossed $270 million worldwide. His films have earned more than $1.2 billion at the domestic box office. Tooley is a Member of the Academy of Motion Picture Arts & Sciences as well as the Producers Guild of America. He earned his B.A. at the University of California, Santa Barbara and, in 2009, was named “Executive of the Year” by the Ischia Global Film Festival.

Career
Tooley began his film career as a creative executive at Interlight Pictures. The first film he financed was 6 Below: Miracle on the Mountain, based on the memoir by Eric LeMarque. The film, starring Josh Hartnett, was released in October 2017.  From 1997 to 2003, Tooley ran production company Newman/Tooley Films with Vincent Newman, producing a slate of independent and studio movies.  He founded Tooley Productions in 2003, where he oversees the creative and financial aspects of all film development and production.

In 2007, Tooley joined Relativity as President of Worldwide Production at Relativity Studios where he played an integral role in the acquisition of Overture Films’ marketing and distribution operations, transforming Relativity from a slate financing entity into a full-fledged independent studio.

In 2011, Tooley was promoted to President of the company, and was responsible for overseeing day-to-day operations. Under Tooley’s leadership, the studio earned numerous Oscar and Golden Globe nominations and three of its releases opened number one at the box office. In addition, he was instrumental in the launch of the company’s television division which, in 2015, sold to private equity firms for $125 million.

While at Relativity, Tooley was an early advocate for and executive produced David O. Russell’s The Fighter, which earned seven Oscar nominations and won two. Also, he produced or executive produced Neil Burger’s Limitless, starring Bradley Cooper, and the action-thriller Act of Valor which both opened number one at the domestic box office. Other credits include Dear John, starring Channing Tatum and Amanda Seyfried; Nicholas Sparks’ Safe Haven; and Steven Soderbergh’s Haywire.

In October 2015, Tooley chose to step down from the company, following a 30-day transition period. In 2018, Tooley appeared in the documentary Making Montgomery Clift.

After leaving Relativity, Tooley returned to producing under his own banner. Current Tooley Entertainment projects include Den of Thieves 2: Pantera starring Gerard Butler and O’Shea Jackson, Jr. with director Christian Gudegast returning for the sequel to the successful heist thriller; the Netflix Original Film Concrete Cowboy starring Idris Elba, Caleb McLaughlin, and Jharrel Jerome; eOne’s Arthur The King starring Mark Wahlberg and directed by Simon Cellan Jones. In addition, Tooley produced Hulu’s The United States Vs. Billie Holiday, starring Andra Day, Trevante Rhodes, and Garrett Hedlund and directed by Lee Daniels, for which Day was nominated for an Academy Award.

Family and personal life
Tooley was born in California.  He is a son of Reva and Bill Tooley.  His father is a real estate professional, and his mother is the founder of the Sun Valley Writers’ Conference in Sun Valley, Idaho. In September 2012, Tooley married Tessa Menefee Benson in Santa Barbara, California. They have one son.

Tooley's brother James is a director and producer of commercial and documentary shows.

Filmography

Producer

References

External links

American film producers
Living people
Year of birth uncertain
Year of birth missing (living people)